"Is It Over Yet" is a song written by Billy Kirsch, and recorded by American country music artist Wynonna.  It was released in October 1993 as the third single from the album Tell Me Why.  The song reached number six on the Billboard Hot Country Singles & Tracks chart. R&B singer Tamia covered the song for her album Beautiful Surprise (2012).

Chart performance

References

1994 singles
1993 songs
Wynonna Judd songs
Tamia songs
Song recordings produced by Tony Brown (record producer)
MCA Records singles
Curb Records singles
Songs written by Billy Kirsch